Bolívar is a canton located in the northeast of the province of Manabí, Ecuador. It borders on the canton Pichincha in the east, the cantons Portoviejo and Junín in the south and the cantons Tosagua and Chone in the north. Its area is approximately 600 km².

Demographics
Ethnic groups as of the Ecuadorian census of 2010:
Mestizo  73.3%
Montubio  19.1%
Afro-Ecuadorian  4.4%
White  3.1%
Indigenous  0.1%
Other  0.1%

References

Cantons of Manabí Province